Apriona punctatissima is a species of beetle in the family Cerambycidae. It was described by Kaup in 1866. It is known from Sulawesi.

References

Batocerini
Beetles described in 1866
Beetles of Oceania